Fadrique may refer to:

Fadrique Alfonso, Lord of Haro (1334–1358), illegitimate son of King Alfonso XI of Castile
Fadrique Álvarez de Toledo, 2nd Duke of Alba (c. 1460-1531), Spanish military leader and politician
Fadrique Álvarez de Toledo, 4th Duke of Alba (1537-1583), Grandee of Spain and a commander in the Spanish army during the Eighty Years' War
Fadrique Álvarez de Toledo, 1st Marquis of Villanueva de Valdueza (1580-1634), Captain General of the Spanish Navy
Fadrique Álvarez de Toledo, the name of the six Dukes of Fernandina
Fadrique Enríquez (c. 1465–1538), fourth Admiral of Castile
Fadrique Enríquez de Mendoza (1390-1473), second Admiral of Castile, Count of Melgar and Rueda, and Lord of Medina del Rioseco
Fadrique de Portugal (c. 1465–1539), Spanish viceroy of Catalonia and bishop of Sigüenza
Alfonso Fadrique (died 1338), eldest and illegitimate son of Frederick II of Sicily, vicar general of the Duchy of Athens
Pedro I Fadrique (died 1355), Count of Salona, vicar general of the Duchy of Athens, son of Alfonso Fadrique
Louis Fadrique (died 1382), Count of Salona, Count of Zitouni and Lord of Aegina, vicar general of the Duchy of Athens, grandson of Alfonso Fadrique